Bengal Law College is a private law college in Santiniketan, Birbhum, West Bengal. It was established in the year 2006. The college is affiliated to University of Burdwan. This college is also approved by the Bar Council of India.

Courses 
The college offers five-years integrated B.A. LL.B (Hons.) and 3 years LL.B (Hons.) course.

See also

References

External links 
 http://www.camelliagroup.in/mainsite/education/law

Law schools in West Bengal
Universities and colleges in Birbhum district
Colleges affiliated to University of Burdwan
Educational institutions established in 2006
2006 establishments in West Bengal